The Abels are a group of 158 Tasmanian mountains above 1100m and with a prominence of at least 150m. They are listed in the books The Abels and climbing them all is part of the Tasmanian peakbagging movement.

The Abels list was devised by Bill Wilkinson in 1994, based on the Munros in Scotland. Many of the Abels are extremely remote, requiring a lengthy hike into the South West Wilderness, including Federation Peak and Precipitous Bluff. The first person to climb all 158 peaks was in Philip Dawson in 2011, and the first woman was Maureen Martin in 2017.

See also 
 List of highest mountains of Tasmania
 South West Wilderness

References 

Mountains of Tasmania